Mount Balatukan is a massive potentially active compound stratovolcano in the northern island of Mindanao, Philippines. It  is the highest point in the province of Misamis Oriental. The volcano has no historical eruptions but displays fumarolic activity. The Balatocan River emanates from and drains the huge crater.

The mountain is a protected area in the country classified as a Natural Park, the Mount Balatukan Range Natural Park. It was created on March 6, 2007 by Proclamation no. 1249.

Location
Mount Balatukan is wholly located in Province of Misamis Oriental in the Northern Mindanao region of the Philippines. The coastal road between Balingasag, Misamis Oriental and Gingoog rims the northern perimeter of the mountain on the north coast of Mindanao.

Physical features
Mount Balatukan is a stratovolcano with a listed elevation of  asl (GVP). The Philippine Institute of Volcanology and Seismology (PHIVOLCS).

Satellite imagery shows it to be densely forested peninsula jutting north into the Bohol Sea.

Volcanism
There are no historical eruptions on Mount Balatukan. The age of its last eruption has not been studied, although some lava flows on the sides of the mountain are determined as Pleistocene. Fumarolic activity is present on the mountain, but its form displays extensive erosion.

Balatukan is part of the Central Mindanao Arc of volcanoes. Its northernmost tip called Sipaka Point, which points to the northeast, is a  cinder cone on a small peninsula called Mount Sipaka.

Listings
The Global Volcanism Program lists the last activity of Balatukan as Holocene but Uncertain.

Philippine Institute of Volcanology and Seismology (Phivolcs) lists Balatukan as Inactive, even though the volcano displays fumarolic activity.

Mythology
In Bukidnon mythology, it is believed that upon death, all seven makatu (souls of a single person) combine into one and journeys into Mount Balatucan for final judgment. The soul first travels to the huge rock, Liyang, which is followed by a journey to Binagbasan, where the Tree of Records grows. After making a mark on the tree, the soul journeys to Pinagsayawan, where the soul must dance and sweat for atonement. The next journey is to Panamparan, where the soul gets a haircut to be presentable at Kumbirahan, where a banquet awaits the soul. The god Andalapit then leads the soul to the foot of Mount Balatucan, where the gods of the dead assemble to judge the soul. Good souls are sent to Dunkituhan, the cloud capped stairway that leads into heaven at the summit of Balatucan. An evil soul is sent to a river of penance for atonement until forgiven. Souls at the river sweat blood, the source of the river’s color and fishy scent. A forgiven soul afterwards also goes into Balatucan’s summit.

See also
 List of active volcanoes in the Philippines
 List of inactive volcanoes in the Philippines
 List of potentially active volcanoes in the Philippines
 List of protected areas of the Philippines
 Pacific ring of fire

References

Stratovolcanoes of the Philippines
Subduction volcanoes
Volcanoes of Mindanao
Mountains of the Philippines
Landforms of Misamis Oriental
Potentially active volcanoes of the Philippines
Natural parks of the Philippines
Pleistocene stratovolcanoes